9 Story Media Group Inc. (formerly known as 9 Story Entertainment Inc.) is a Canadian media production and distribution company founded in September 2002 by Vince Commisso, Steve Jarosz, and Blake Tohana.

History

As 9 Story Entertainment
The company was founded in September 2002 as 9 Story Entertainment by Vince Commisso and Steven Jarosz. On September 21, 2006, 9 Story launched an international distribution division headed by former Universal Studios executive, Natalie Osborne, known as 9 Story Enterprises.

9 Story produced its first live-action series, Survive This, from 2008 to 2010.

On September 20, 2011, 9 Story Entertainment became the co-producer and distributor of the animated series Arthur. 9 Story would produce the series from seasons 16 to 19.

On April 8, 2013, 9 Story announced that it would acquire the children's and family distribution library of CCI Entertainment; the acquisition was completed on July 24.

As 9 Story Media Group
On October 10, 2014, 9 Story Entertainment rebranded as 9 Story Media Group, following Neil Court and Zelnick Media Capital becoming majority owners a few months prior.

On August 18, 2015, 9 Story Media Group acquired the Dublin-based animation studio Brown Bag Films.

On October 6, 2015, 9 Story announced an agreement with American toy manufacturer Mattel to relaunch/reboot Barney & Friends and Angelina Ballerina under license from HIT Entertainment for planned releases in 2017, but nothing was heard from them in terms of either production or release since then.

On May 25, 2016, 9 Story acquired the global distribution rights to Garfield and Friends. Following the acquisition of Paws, Inc. by Viacom in 2019, 9 Story's distribution license was terminated. The series is now distributed through Nickelodeon. 

On October 21, 2016, 9 Story's distribution arm, 9 Story Enterprises, was rebranded as 9 Story Distribution International and relocated operations from Toronto to Dublin.

On October 15, 2017, 9 Story rebranded its Toronto 2D animation studio after Brown Bag Films, with the Irish studio becoming 9 Story's production arm for both 2D and 3D animation across Dublin, Manchester, and Toronto. At the same time, Brown Bag Films became one of 9 Story's main divisions, alongside 9 Story Distribution International.

On January 12, 2018, 9 Story announced that they had acquired production company, Out of the Blue Enterprises, for an undisclosed amount and rebranded them to 9 Story USA. 9 Story would also acquire the rights to the Colorforms brand.

On May 13, 2018, 9 Story unveiled an updated logo and announced the launch of 9 Story Brands, a consumer products division.

On July 10, 2018, 9 Story acquired the children's and family distribution catalog and development slate of Breakthrough Entertainment. On February 4, 2019, 9 Story announced that they had acquired Bali-based animation studio BASE for an undisclosed amount, and rebranded it after Brown Bag Films.

On April 1, 2019, 9 Story signed a deal with Scholastic Corporation to distribute 230 half hours of programming, which would bring 9 Story's overall content library at the time to 4,000 half hours of programming. In 2022, Vince Commisso was named alongside John Galway as a winner of the Academy of Canadian Cinema & Television's Board of Directors Tribute Award at the 10th Canadian Screen Awards.

Programming
3 Amigonauts (2017)
Almost Naked Animals (2011–2013)
Arthur (2012–2016) (seasons 16–19)
Best Ed (2008–2009)
Blue's Clues & You! (2019–present)
Cache Craze (2013–2014)
Camp Lakebottom (2013–2017)
Clifford the Big Red Dog (2019–2021)
Creative Galaxy (2013–2019)
Daniel Tiger's Neighborhood (2012–present)
Fugget About It (2012–2016)
Furze World Wonders (2017)
Futz! (2007–2008)
Get Rolling with Otis (2021)
Harriet the Spy: Blog Wars (2010)
Hello, Jack! The Kindness Show (2022–present)
If the World Were a Village (2005)
Jacob Two-Two (2005–2006) (distributed by Nelvana) (season 5)
Karma's World (2021–present)
Let's Go Luna! (2018–2022)
The Magic School Bus Rides Again (2017–2020)
Max & Ruby (2007–2013) (distributed by Nelvana) (seasons 3–5)
Mischief City (2005)
My Friend Rabbit (2007–2008)
Nature Cat (2015–2021) (seasons 1–3)
Numb Chucks (2014–2016)
Nerds and Monsters (2014–2016)
Peep and the Big Wide World (2004–2007, 2010–2011)
Peg + Cat (2013–2018)
Pound Puppies (2010) (season 1, episodes 1–7)
Postcards from Buster (2006–2012) (seasons 2–4)
Rosie's Rules (2022–present)
Skyland (2005–2007)
The Stanley Dynamic (2015–2017)
Survive This (2009–2010)
Tish Tash (2021–present)
Top Wing (2017–2020)
Wibbly Pig (2009–2010)
Wild Kratts (2011–present)
Xavier Riddle and the Secret Museum (2019–2022)

References

External links

Canadian animation studios
Companies based in Toronto
Mass media companies established in 2002
Television production companies of Canada
2002 establishments in Ontario
Canadian companies established in 2002